Aspades is a genus of moth in the family Gelechiidae.

Species
Aspades armatovalva (Janse, 1963)
Aspades hutchinsonella (Walsingham, 1891)
Aspades luteomaculata Bidzilya & Mey, 2011

References

Pexicopiini
Moth genera